The Western School Board was a Canadian school district in Prince Edward Island, from the 1990s to 2012.

It was an Anglophone district operating 21 public schools (gr. 1–12) in Prince County.  It maintained offices in Summerside and Elmsdale.

The Western School Board was created in the 1990s when Regional School Unit 1 and Regional School Unit 2 were merged. Current enrollment was approximately 7,400 students.

In 2012 the English Language School Board was created when the Eastern School District and Western School Board were merged.

Kensington Family
Kensington Intermediate Senior High School
Queen Elizabeth Elementary School

Kinkora Family

Kinkora Regional High School
Somerset Elementary School
Amherst Cove Consolidated School

Three Oaks Family
Three Oaks Senior High School
Athena Consolidated School
Elm Street Elementary School
Greenfield Elementary School
Miscouche Consolidated School
Parkside Elementary School
Summerside Intermediate School

Westisle Family
Westisle Composite High School
Alberton Elementary School
Bloomfield Elementary School
Ellerslie Elementary School
Hernewood Intermediate School
Merritt E. Callaghan Intermediate School
O'Leary Elementary School
St. Louis Elementary School
Tignish Elementary School

See also
Eastern School District
Commission scolaire de langue française

External links
 http://www.edu.pe.ca/wsb/

Former school districts in Prince Edward Island